Nyasha Mayavo (born 1 October 1992) is a Zimbabwean first-class cricketer who plays for Mid West Rhinos. He was the leading run-scorer in the 2017–18 Logan Cup for Mid West Rhinos, with 550 runs in seven matches.

In June 2018, he was named in a Board XI team for warm-up fixtures ahead of the 2018 Zimbabwe Tri-Nation Series. In December 2020, he was selected to play for the Rhinos in the 2020–21 Logan Cup.

References

External links
 

1992 births
Living people
Zimbabwean cricketers
Mid West Rhinos cricketers
Sportspeople from Bulawayo